Nirahua Hindustani 2 is a 2017 Indian Bhojpuri-language action drama film written and directed by Manjul Thakur and produced by Rahul Khan under banner of "Rahul Khan Production". The film features Dinesh Lal Yadav, Amrapali Dubey and Sanchita Banerjee (Bhojpuri debut) in lead roles while Sanjay Pandey, Ayaz Khan, Kiran Yadav, Ashish Shendre, Prakash Jais, Santosh Verma, Sanjay Mahanand and Samarth Chaturvedi in supporting roles. It is a sequel of 2014 film Nirahua Hindustani. It holds the records of "Most Viewed Bhojpuri Film" on YouTube with 324 millions views.

Cast
Dinesh Lal Yadav as Nirahu Kumar Yadav
Amrapali Dubey as Chandani Nirahu Yadav
Sanchita Benarjee as  Kiran Khanna (Kiran Nirahu Yadav) 
Prakash Jais as Kunru Shahri (Nirahua's Friend)
Ayaz Khan as Rakesh Kumar (Rocky)
 Ashish Shendre as Nirahua's Father
Kiran Yadav as Nirahua's Mother
 Samarth Chaturvedi as Shivkumar Yadav (Nirahua's elder Brother)
Sanjay Mahanand as Nandu (Nirahua's younger Brother)Sanjay Pandey as Paras Yadav (Nirahua's Uncle) Ritu Pandey as Paras Wife (Nirahua's Aunty)Sanjay Verma as Nirahua's Friend Seema Singh as Comio Dev Singh as Bank Robber Rahul Khan as Kiran's Friend Asgar Khan as CID Officer Santosh Pahalwan as CID Officer''

Production
Filming for this film was done in Kelwari village in Bharwara, Dhamtari, Wonder Land Water Park (Raipur), Dr Ajay Sahay Hospital (Raipur) in Chhattisgarh and Birwai village in Azamgarh district of Uttar Pradesh with some scenes shot in Nikunj Kunj (Madh), Basra Studio (Kandiwali), Nandan Van village (Malad wast), Uttan Beach (Bhayandar), Fever Art and Golden Tulip Star Hotel (Vasai) in Mumbai.

The cinematography has been done by Sarfraz Rashid Khan while choreography is by Kanu Mukharjee. Art direction done by Nazir Shaikh. It was edited by Santosh Harawade while action direction by Andlib Pathan. Dress designed by Kavita-Sunita. Background music scored by Aslam Surty while VFX done by "What Studio". Dubbing done in "Park Avenue Studio".

Release
The film was released on 12 May 2017 at theatres of Bihar, Jharkhand and Nepal. He is remarked as all time blockbuster on Bhojpuri box office.

Soundtrack 

The soundtrack for "Nirahua Hindustani 2" was composed by Chhote Baba and Madhukar Anand with lyrics penned by Pyare Lal Yadav, Azad Singh, Shyam Dehati and Santosh Puri. The soundtrack included an unusually large number of songs at 10. It was produced under the "Wave Music" label, who also bought his satellite rights.

All songs of this film was released on YouTube official Channel of "Wave Music". All songs are superhit on YouTube. His song " Jhanak Jala Matha" sung by Indu Sonali and Alka Jha is crossed 28 millions views on YouTube.

Marketing 
Official trailer of the film was released on 30 April 2017 at YouTube official handle of Wave Music and he crossed over 11 millions views till now.

The film was also released at online video platform site YouTube on 26 November 2017 at official channel of Wave Music Bhojpuri, and he create history of Most Viewed Bhojpuri Film on YouTube. As on 12 June 2019, he is the first Bhojpuri film to crossed 150 million on YouTube. He crossed over 211 millions views on till now.

Award and nominations

References

Indian action drama films
2017 films
Indian sequel films
Films shot in Mumbai
Films set in Mumbai
Indian courtroom films
2010s Bhojpuri-language films
2017 action drama films